Christian Gaidet (born 31 December 1963 in Bourg-Saint-Maurice) is a French former alpine skier who competed in the 1988 Winter Olympics.

External links
 sports-reference.com

1963 births
Living people
French male alpine skiers
Olympic alpine skiers of France
Alpine skiers at the 1988 Winter Olympics
Universiade medalists in alpine skiing
Universiade silver medalists for France
Competitors at the 1983 Winter Universiade
People from Bourg-Saint-Maurice
Sportspeople from Savoie
20th-century French people